Tetragramma donaldtrumpi is a species of fossil sea urchins discovered and identified by William R. Thompson, Jr. in 2016. The specimen locality is from the Lower Cretaceous, Trinity Group, of the Glen Rose Formation near Fischer, Texas, in the United States.

The genus Tetragramma is known from the Upper Jurassic (Oxfordian) to the Upper Cretaceous (Turonian).

Thompson named the species to honor then Republican presidential nominee Donald Trump. A paleontology lab at the University of Texas at Austin holds a fossil of the species, along with 45 other species.

References

Phymosomatoida
Cretaceous echinoderms
Jurassic echinoderms
Fossil taxa described in 2016
Donald Trump